Allium yongdengense is a plant species native to the Gansu and Qinghai regions in China.

Allium yongdengense has a cluster of narrow bulbs each up to 5 mm in diameter. Scape is generally less than 20 cm tall. Leaves are shorter than the scape, about 1 mm across. Umbels have only a few purplish flowers.

References

External links
line drawing of Allium yongdengense, Flora of China Illustrations vol. 24, fig. 191, 1-3

yongdengense
Onions
Flora of China
Flora of Gansu
Flora of Qinghai
Plants described in 1980